The American Musicological Society (AMS) is a musicological organization which researches, promotes and produces publications on music. Founded in 1934, the AMS was begun by leading American musicologists of the time, and was crucial in legitimizing musicology as a scholarly discipline.

At present, approximately 3000 individual members from forty nations are a part of the Society. Since 1948, the AMS has published the triannual Journal of the American Musicological Society.

History
The American Musicological Society grew out of a small contingent of the Music Teachers National Association and, more directly, the New York Musicological Society (1930–1934). It was officially founded on 3 June 1934 by the leading American musicologists of the time, George S. Dickinson, Carl Engel, Gustave Reese, Helen Heffron Roberts, Joseph Schillinger, Charles Seeger, Harold Spivacke, Oliver Strunk, and Joseph Yasser. Its first president was Otto Kinkeldey, the first American to receive an appointment as professor of musicology (Cornell University, 1930).

Overview
The society consists of approximately 3000 individual members divided among fifteen regional chapters across the United States, Canada, and elsewhere, as well as 60 committees and subcommittees. It was admitted to the American Council of Learned Societies in 1951, and participates in the Répertoire International des Sources Musicales and the Répertoire International de Littérature Musicale. The society's annual meetings consist of paper presentations, panels, and lecture-concerts, as well as more-or-less informal meetings of numerous related musical societies. Many of the society's awards, prizes and fellowships are announced at these meetings.

Fifteen regional chapters are associated with the AMS, and  these chapters’ activities are supported by the AMS Chapter Fund.

The AMS awards three fellowships to graduate students in musicology, with a deadline for applications typically in early January. They include the Alvin H. Johnson AMS 50 Dissertation-year Fellowships, Howard Mayer Brown Fellowship, and the Holmes/D'Accone Dissertation Fellowship in Opera Studies.

Publications
Most of the society's resources are dedicated to musicological publications: the triannual Journal of the American Musicological Society (1948–present) published by the University of California Press. The journal publishes scholarship related to historical musicology, critical theory, music analysis, ethnomusicology, gender and sexuality, popular music, aesthetics and more. JAMS was preceded by the annual Bulletin (1936–1947) and the annual Papers (1936–1941). With Oxford University Press, the society sponsors the series AMS Studies in Music.

Other items published by the society include the series Music of the United States of America (1993–present), and the blog Musicology Now. MUSA is a forty-volume scholarly series that addresses American musical styles, including jazz, psalmody, popular song, art song, and experimental music. Musicology Now publishes essays written for the general public. It seeks to engage educators, musicians, listeners, and colleagues with fresh research and ideas about music. The Journal of Music History Pedagogy (JMHP) covers any aspect of the teaching and learning of music history at both the undergraduate and graduate level, for all audiences (majors, non-majors, and the public), and all genres of music.

Additionally, the AMS underwrites expenses involved in the publication of works of musical scholarship, providing between $75,000 and $100,000 of publication subventions each year.

List of presidents

References

Citations

Sources

Further reading
 Oliver Strunk: State and Resources of Musicology in the United States, ACLS Bulletin 19 (1932)
 Arthur Mendel, Curt Sachs, and Carroll C. Pratt: Some Aspects of Musicology (New York, 1957)
 B. S. Brook, ed.: American Musicological Society, Greater New York Chapter: a Programmatic History 1935–1965 (New York, c1965)
 W. J. Mitchell: "A Hitherto Unknown—or a Recently Discovered...," Musicology and the Computer, ed. B. S. Brook (New York, 1970), 1–8

External links 

 
 
 Musicology Now blog, run by AMS

1934 establishments in the United States
Academic organizations based in the United States
Member organizations of the American Council of Learned Societies
Music organizations based in the United States
Music-related professional associations
Musicology
Organizations established in 1934